1929 in philosophy

Events 
Cassirer–Heidegger debate

Publications 
 Alfred North Whitehead, Process and Reality (1929)
 Bertrand Russell, Marriage and Morals (1929)
 Virginia Woolf, A Room of One's Own (1929)
 José Ortega y Gasset, The Revolt of the Masses (1929)
 Julian Huxley and G. P. Wells, The Science of Life (1929)
 I. A. Richards, Practical Criticism (1929)
 Martin Heidegger, The Essence of Reasons (originally published as 'Vom Wesen des Grundes' in 1929)

Births 
 January 3 - Gordon Moore 
 January 12 - Jaakko Hintikka (died 2015)
 January 12 - Alasdair MacIntyre 
 January 19 - Nel Noddings 
 March 17 - Peter L. Berger 
 April 1 - Milan Kundera 
 April 23 - George Steiner (died 2020)
 May 16 - Adrienne Rich (died 2012) 
 May 29 - Harry Frankfurt 
 June 10 - E. O. Wilson 
 June 18 - Jürgen Habermas 
 July 27 - Jean Baudrillard 
 September 21 - Bernard Williams 
 October 15 - Hubert Dreyfus

Deaths 
 January 19 - Liang Qichao (born 1873)
 August 3 - Thorstein Veblen (born 1857)
 December 10 - Franz Rosenzweig (born 1886)

References 

Philosophy
20th-century philosophy
Philosophy by year